Kots Kaal Pato (English: Strangle the Duck) is a controversial event practiced among some Mayan youth in the village of Citilcum within the Mexican state of Yucatán. In the event, ducks, bound to high wooden crossbeams by their feet, are mutilated in a ceremony-like atmosphere. It has attracted condemnation from animal rights activists in the region, with several Mexican environmental authorities filing an animal cruelty complaint on the matter.

See also
Animal cruelty in Mexico

References

Animal rights
Animal sacrifice
Cruelty to animals
Ducks
Maya peoples of Mexico
Mexican culture